Bedford Basin is a large enclosed bay, forming the northwestern end of Halifax Harbour on Canada's Atlantic coast.  It is named in honour of John Russell, 4th Duke of Bedford.

Geography

Geographically, the basin is situated entirely within the Halifax Regional Municipality and is oriented northwest-southeast, measuring approximately 8 kilometres long and 5 kilometres wide, surrounded by low hills measuring up to 160 metres (525 feet) in elevation, although most elevations range up to 30–60 m (100–200 ft).

The basin is quite deep with some areas measuring several dozen metres in depth;  the good holding ground (mud) on the basin floor make it an ideal protected anchorage.  The basin's geologic history can be traced to the Wisconsin Glaciation when it, along with "The Narrows", formed part of the pre-historic Sackville River valley.

The basin contains the following sub-basins:

 Bedford Bay, in the extreme northwest.
 Birch Cove, on the western shore.
 Fairview Cove, in the extreme southwest.
 Wrights Cove, on the eastern shore.

Bedford on the northwestern corner takes its name from the basin, while Dartmouth sits on its eastern shore and Rockingham occupies the majority of the western shore. Africville Park is situated on the southern shore near the entrance into The Narrows.

Shoreline development

The lands surrounding the basin are heavily developed with the only significant greenspace remaining being along the northeastern shore of the basin where a significant blast buffer zone surrounds Canadian Forces Ammunition Depot Bedford (CFAD Bedford); this is the Royal Canadian Navy's weapons magazine for its Atlantic fleet, known as Maritime Forces Atlantic (MARLANT).

The south shore of the basin at Fairview Cove hosts one of Halifax's two container terminals as well as Nova Scotia's largest railway yard, Rockingham Yard, operated by Canadian National Railway (CN).

The east shore of the basin hosts Burnside Industrial Park, the largest industrial park in HRM, as well as a bulk gypsum terminal at Wright's Cove and the Bedford Institute of Oceanography (which also derives its name from the basin) situated near the entrance to The Narrows.

The vast majority of the western shore to the head of the basin is fronted by rail lines, behind which are a mix of residential/commercial and institutional developments.

History
The North American station of the Royal Navy was based just outside the entrance of the basin from 1759 to 1905, at the Royal Naval Dockyards. The naval base served as the station's headquarters until 1818, when it became the summer headquarters of the station. Defences were built around the approach towards the basin's entrance, with the construction of the York Redoubt at Ferguson's Cove, as well as fortifications on Georges Island, and McNabs Island. These defences were a part of the Halifax Defence Complex. In 1907, the Royal Naval Dockyards was transferred to the Government of Canada, and continues to operate as CFB Halifax.

In December 1917 the basin was the site of the world's worst non-nuclear explosion - generally known as the Halifax explosion.

The basin played a key role during the First and Second World Wars when the German navy used submarines to disrupt Allied shipping. Given the size of the Port of Halifax, and its vicinity to Europe in contrast to other North American ports, the basin was used as an assembly point for Atlantic-convoys bound for Europe. With defences built just outside of the only access point into the basin (a strait called The Narrows), it provided the Royal Navy and Royal Canadian Navy a safe place to assemble its convoys consisting of hundreds of merchant ships in relative security, while torpedo nets kept German submarines at bay.

In 1994, the defences that protected Bedford Basin were designated a National Historic Site of Canada, commemorating the assembly of convoys in Bedford Basin during the Second World Wars. A plaque was erected at Admiral Harry DeWolf Park on the Bedford waterfront. The park derives its name from Admiral H.G. DeWolf, of the Royal Canadian Navy.

In 2010, on the 100th anniversary of the Royal Canadian Navy, a plaque was unveiled at Bedford Lake, Griesbach, Edmonton, Alberta, in recognition of the role played by Bedford Basin, Nova Scotia, in World War I and World War II.

"Bedford Basin is a large enclosed anchorage, forming the northwestern end of Halifax Harbour in Nova Scotia on Canada's Atlantic coast. The basin is quite deep and the good holding ground on the basin floor makes it an ideal anchorage and a protected location for ships.
The Basin came to international significance during both the First and Second World Wars when the German navy began to use submarines as an offensive weapon against Allied shipping Canada's prominent role in the First World War led to Halifax being chosen as the primary logistic port for resupplying Western Europe. The protected waters of Bedford Basin allowed the Royal Navy and Royal Canadian Navy to assemble convoys consisting of hundreds of merchant ships in relative security while torpedo nets kept German submarines at bay. As observed By Rear Admiral Leonard W. Murray (RCN), Halifax saw first hand the tragic loss of life amongst merchant seamen. The Basin was a daily witness to the grim war at sea. Stricken vessels limped back to port and seamen fold their stories of battle and the hazards of the North Atlantic convoy routes.
Today, CFB Halifax is located on the channel at the entrance to Bedford Basin and is the home of Canada's Atlantic fleet."- Bedford Basin Memorial in Alberta

References

External links

Landforms of Halifax, Nova Scotia
Bays of Nova Scotia
Landforms of Halifax County, Nova Scotia